Sokodé is the second largest city in Togo and seat of the Tchaoudjo and Centrale Region in the center of the country,  north of Lomé. With a population of 86,500 (2004), currently at around 189,000, the city is situated between the Mo and Mono rivers, and it is a commercial center for the surrounding agricultural areas. It is a multi-ethnic and multi-religious city, but is dominated by Islam. It is an administrative center where the majority of Kotokolis live along with Muslims whose cloths are reminiscent of North Africa.  Men have also been known to wear big boubous and women, the veil above beautifully colored outfits.

History 

Ancient indigenous stock of the region mixed with more recent migrants of Gurma, from the eastern part of the Niger Bend, between Ouagadougou and Niamey, who brought the political system of chiefdoms with them. Added to this structure were Sudanese traders and craftsmen (the Mandinka, from historic Mali) and Hausa, a dynamic force since the 16th century. By choosing, in late 1897, to establish an outpost at Sokodé, Germans entrenched the role of the now dominant Kotokoli chiefdoms.

The city developed in precolonial times as a commercial crossroads on the Kola nut route between Ghana and Benin. Currently it is center on the only north-south road in Togo, linking the capital Lomé to Burkina Faso. Urbanization accelerated during colonization. The city consists of older villages that have now become neighborhoods.

Sokodé continues to be governed by a system balanced between a municipal administration and traditional chiefs. Historically, the chiefs of various villages were included in a leadership council, the Tchaoudjo.

Geography

Sokodé's region is characterized by a dense network of rivers and hilly terrain. The two main rivers are the Kpondjo and Kpandi, which flow into the Na which in turn feeds the Mono River. The border between the Mono and the Volta River drainage basins is located a few kilometers north of the city. It is now in the catchment of the river Mô.

Demographics

Sokodé is the city with the highest proportion of Muslims in Togo. 70% of the population is Muslim and the remaining 30% are Christians, mostly Catholics. Sokodé is home to the Tem people and most people in Sokodé speak Kotokoli (or tem). The ethnonym Kotokoli is the name that was given to these speakers by traders of the Niger Bend. Many other languages are spoken in Togo, especially ewé, the dominant language of the south, and Kabyé, dominant language of the Kara region, further north. The Kotokoli and Kabyè languages are closely related.

From the standpoint of urban landscape, the city can be divided into two parts: the center, with high density traditional housing,  and the suburbs, with housing becoming progressively less dense as one moves away from the center. Modern materials have been increasingly replacing traditional materials (mudbrick).

Climate
The evaporation rate is high, estimated at  / year, and is particularly marked in the harmattan period from November to January. The humidity is very variable, and depends on all the above factors.

Economy
The economy of Sokodé is dominated by transport, trade and handicrafts. There is little industrial activity, like cotton ginning and sugar processing.

Farmers grow primarily corn, cassava, yams, pepper and beans, and many gardeners and farmers live on the periphery of Sokodé. They have herds of cows in the fields. Meanwhile, nomadic Fulani frequently pass near Sokodé, with their herds of zebu en route between Burkina Faso and Nigeria.

The vegetables are grown especially along the  Kpondjo and Inusayo rivers. Most agricultural areas are floodplains, with growers beginning cultivation following the rainy season.

Culture

Festivals

 'Gadao-Adossa-Kosso': the main Kotokoli festival consists of three days of festivities, from Friday to Sunday. Celebrated the evening before Adossa, Gadao's function is to thank the ancestors for abundant harvests. Adossa, or the Festival of Knives, is an initiation rite originating with Semassi warriors who demonstrate their strength and courage by undergoing physical challenges. The next day is Kosso, the Festival of Women, in which women dance in the Municipal Park in Sokodé City.

Among others, major festivals are held by different Sokodé clans. In most festivals traditional dancers are invited from the region, as well as riders mimicking the Semassi warriors, spinning at full speed in the middle of the crowd.

Places of worship    
Among the places of worship, they are predominantly Muslim mosques. There are also Christian churches and temples : Roman Catholic Diocese of Sokodé (Catholic Church), Evangelical Presbyterian Church of Togo (World Communion of Reformed Churches), Togo Baptist Convention (Baptist World Alliance), Living Faith Church Worldwide, Redeemed Christian Church of God, Assemblies of God.

Sport
The town is home to AC Semassi F.C. who play at the  Stade Municipal as do the Tchaoudjo Athlétic Club.

Notable people
Kotokro - the founder of Sokodé.
Zarifou Ayéva - politician
Mohamed Kader - footballer
Edem Kodjo - former Prime Minister of Togo
Assimiou Touré - footballer

See also
Sokodé Airport

References

 
Populated places in Centrale Region, Togo